János Petrovics (born 9 August 1971) is a Hungarian boxer. He competed in the men's lightweight event at the 1992 Summer Olympics.

References

External links
 

1971 births
Living people
Hungarian male boxers
Olympic boxers of Hungary
Boxers at the 1992 Summer Olympics
People from Dombóvár
Lightweight boxers
Sportspeople from Tolna County